Wilson Antônio de Resende Júnior, commonly known as Wilsinho (born 20 August 1982 in Goiânia, Goiás), is a Brazilian footballer who plays as a forward.

References

External links

1982 births
Living people
Brazilian footballers
Association football forwards
Goiânia Esporte Clube players
Liga Portugal 2 players
C.D. Feirense players
Muaither SC players
Najran SC players
Qatar Stars League players
Al-Wakrah SC players
Brazilian expatriate footballers
Expatriate footballers in Portugal
Expatriate footballers in Saudi Arabia
Expatriate footballers in Qatar
Expatriate footballers in Kuwait
Brazilian expatriate sportspeople in Kuwait
Al-Sulaibikhat SC players
Saudi Professional League players
Qatari Second Division players
Kuwait Premier League players
Al Jahra SC players
Sportspeople from Goiás